Lézigné is a former commune in the Maine-et-Loire department in western France. On 1 January 2019, it was merged into the new commune Huillé-Lézigné.

See also
Communes of the Maine-et-Loire department

References

Former communes of Maine-et-Loire